

Voter statistics 
ELECTORS

NO. OF VALID VOTES 6920818

NO. OF VOTES REJECTED 324463

NO. OF POLLING STATIONS 12698

Performance of women and men candidates

Constituencies Data

No. of constituencies

Results

Result by Party

Results by Region

Results By Constituency

See Also
 Elections in Punjab, India

References

State Assembly elections in Punjab, India
1980s in Punjab, India
Punjab